Codium arenicola is a species of seaweed in the Codiaceae family.

In Western Australia is found along the coast in the Pilbara region of Western Australia near Karratha.

References

arenicola
Plants described in 2014